Ram Manohar Lohia ; (23 March 1910 – 12 October 1967) was an activist in the Indian independence movement and a socialist political leader. During the last phase of British rule in India, he worked with the Congress Radio which was broadcast secretly from various places in Bombay until 1942.

Early life

Ram Manohar Lohia was born on 23 March 1910 at Akbarpur, modern-day Uttar Pradesh in a Bania  family. His mother died in 1912, when he was just two years old, and he was later brought up by his father Hiralal who never remarried.There was a lady who belonged to the Barber community, who brought him up in his early life. She was his family servant. In 1918 he accompanied his father to Bombay where he completed his high school education. He attended the Banaras Hindu University to complete his intermediate and work after standing first in his school's matriculation examinations in 1927. He then joined the Vidyasagar College, under the University of Calcutta and in 1929, earned his B.A. degree. He decided to attend Frederick William University (today's Humboldt University of Berlin, Germany), choosing it over the educational institutes in Britain, to convey his dim view of British philosophy. He soon learnt German and received financial assistance based on his outstanding academic performance, studying national economy as his major subject as a doctoral student from 1929 to 1933.

Lohia wrote his Ph.D. thesis paper on the topic of Salt Taxation in India, focusing on Gandhi's socio-economic theory.

National movement

Lohia was one of the founders of the Congress Socialist Party and editor of its mouthpiece Congress Socialist. In 1936, he was selected by Jawaharlal Nehru as the secretary of the Foreign Department of the All India Congress Committee (A.I.C.C), the highest body of the Congress Party. By the time he quit that responsibility in 1938, Lohia started to develop his own political standpoint by critically examining positions held by the Gandhian leadership of the Congress and the Communists who had poured into the CSP. In June 1940, he was arrested and sentenced to a jail term of two years for delivering anti-war speeches. Already released by the end of 1941, Lohia became one of the leading figures of the Central Directorate which clandestinely tried to organise the Quit India revolt, sparked by Gandhi in August 1942. Captured in May 1944, he was incarcerated and tortured in Lahore Fort. As one of the last high security prisoners, Lohia, together with Jayaprakash Narayan, was finally released on 11 April 1946. He was the one who gave the idea of sapta kranti.

Later political career
As a member of the Congress Socialist Party Lohia joined with that party when it left Congress. He remained a member of the Socialist Party when it fused in 1952 with the Kisan Majdoor Praja Party to form the Praja Socialist Party. Unhappy with the new party Lohia led a split from it to reform the Socialist Party (Lohia) in 1956. He lost to Nehru in 1962 general election in Phulpur. In 1963 Lohia became a member of the Lok Sabha after a by-election in Farrukhabad (Lok Sabha constituency) and in 1965 merged the Socialist Party (Lohia) into the ranks of the Samyukta Socialist Party. The two socialist factions merged, split and re-merged several times. In 1967, Lohia played an instrumental role in formation of the first non-Congress government in Uttar Pradesh. This alliance was formed by Lohia and Bharatiya Jan Sangh leader Nanaji Deshmukh  He won Lok Sabha general election of 1967 from Kannauj (Lok Sabha constituency), but died a few months later.

Major writings in English
 The Caste System: Hyderabad, Navahind [1964] 147 p.
 Foreign Policy: Aligarh, P.C. Dwadash Shreni, [1963?] 381 p.
 Fragments of World Mind: Maitrayani Publishers & Booksellers ; Allahabad [1949] 262 p.
 Fundamentals of a World Mind: ed. by K.S. Karanth. Bombay, Sindhu Publications, [1987] 130 p.
 Guilty Men of India’s Partition: Lohia Samata Vidyalaya Nyas, Publication Dept.,[1970] 103 p.
 India, China, and Northern Frontiers: Hyderabad, Navahind [1963] 272 p.
 Interval During Politics: Hyderabad, Navahind [1965] 197 p.
 Marx, Gandhi and Socialism: Hyderabad, Navahind [1963] 550 p.
 Collected Works of Dr Lohia  A nine volume set edited by veteran Socialist writer Dr Mastram Kapoor in English and published by Anamika Publications, New Delhi.

Writings in Kannada Translation

 The complete works of Dr. Ram Manohar Lohia were translated and published in six volumes by the Government of Karnataka at the subsidized price.
 There were lot of books available in Kannada about Lohia and also many private publications published the works of Lohia.

Memorials
 Avadh University in Faizabad was renamed as "Dr. Ram Manohar Lohia Avadh University".
 The Dr. Ram Manohar Lohiya National Law University in Lucknow, one of India's top National law schools, is named after him.
 18th June Road, in Panjim, Goa, is named after him. It was that date in 1946 where he launched an agitation against colonial rule.      
 The Willingdon Hospital of New Delhi was renamed Ram Manohar Lohia Hospital in the 1970s. Ram Manohar Lohia died in this hospital due to health complications following a surgery
 Dr. Ram Manohar Lohia Institute of Medical Sciences is a medical institute for undergraduate and postgraduate studies in Lucknow.
Dr. Ram Manohar Lohiya Bhawan is a community hall in his hometown of Akbarpur, Ambedkar Nagar and is the only memorial in his name.

See also
Jagdeo Prasad

References

Further reading
Makers of Modern India, by Ramachandra Guha. Published by Penguin Viking (2010),  
 Socialist Thought in India: The Contribution of Ram Manohar Lohia, by M. Arumugam, New Delhi, Sterling (1978)
 Dr. Ram Manohar Lohia, his Life and Philosophy, by Indumati Kelkar. Published for Samajwadi Sahitya Sansthan, Delhi by Anamika Publishers & Distributors (2009) 
 Lohia, A Study, by N. C. Mehrotra, Atma Ram (1978)
 Lohia and Parliament, Published by Lok Sabha Secretariat (1991)
 Lohia thru Letters, Published by Roma Mitra (1983)
 Lohia and America Meet, by Harris Woofford, Sindhu (1987)
 Leftism in India: 1917–1947, by Satyabrata Rai Chowdhuri, London and New Delhi, Palgrave Macmillan (2008)
 Lohia Ek Jeevani, by Omprakash Deepak And Arvind Mohan, Published by Wagdevi Prakashan (2006)
 Rammanohar Lohia: The Man and his Ism, by Girish Mishra and Braj Kumar Pandey, Eastern Books, New Delhi, 1992

External links

 Lohia Pictures at Kamat

1910 births
1967 deaths
Banaras Hindu University alumni
Vidyasagar College alumni
University of Calcutta alumni
Humboldt University of Berlin alumni
Goa liberation activists
Indian socialists
Praja Socialist Party politicians
Lok Sabha members from Uttar Pradesh
People from Ambedkar Nagar district
Prisoners and detainees of British India
Indian independence activists from Uttar Pradesh
Indian National Congress politicians from Uttar Pradesh
India MPs 1967–1970
India MPs 1962–1967
People from Farrukhabad
People from Kannauj district
Samyukta Socialist Party politicians
Kisan Mazdoor Praja Party politicians